The 2021 TCU Horned Frogs baseball team represents Texas Christian University during the 2021 NCAA Division I baseball season. The Horned Frogs play their home games at Lupton Stadium as a member of the Big 12 Conference. They are led by head coach Jim Schlossnagle, in his 18th season at TCU.

Previous season
The 2020 TCU Horned Frogs baseball team notched an 11–4 record in February and early March; however, the remainder of the season was abruptly halted on March 13, 2020, when the Big 12 Conference canceled the remainder of the athletics season due to the Coronavirus pandemic.

Personnel

Coaching Staff

Roster

Schedule and results

|-
! style="" | Regular Season (34–12)
|- valign="top" 

|- bgcolor="#ffbbbb"
| February 20 || 3:00 pm || FloSports || vs. #6 Ole Miss* || #10 || Globe Life FieldArlington, TX || L3–7 || Kimbrell(1–0) || Ray(0–1) || Broadway(1) || 16,908 || 0–1 || — || StatsStory
|- bgcolor="#bbffbb"
| February 21 || 11:00 am || FloSports || vs. #7 Mississippi State* || #10 || Globe Life FieldArlington, TX || W3–2 || Smith(1–0) || Harding(0–1) || Wright(1) || 17,587 || 1–1 || — || StatsStory
|- bgcolor="#ffbbbb"
| February 22 || 6:00 pm || FloSports || vs. #8 Arkansas* || #10 || Globe Life FieldArlington, TX || L1–4 || Costeiu(1–0) || King(0–1) || Kopps(1) || 13,659 || 1–2 || — || StatsStory
|- bgcolor="#bbffbb"
| February 23 || 6:30 pm || ESPN+ || * || #14 || Lupton StadiumFort Worth, TX || W20–0 || Brown(1–0) || Williams(0–1) || — || 2,243 || 2–2 || — || StatsStory
|- bgcolor="#bbffbb"
| February 26 || 6:30 pm || ESPN+ || Liberty* || #14 || Lupton StadiumFort Worth, TX || W4–1 || Green(1–0) || Delaite(0–1) || — || 2,206 || 3–2 || — || StatsStory
|- bgcolor="#bbffbb"
| February 27 || 12:00 pm || ESPN+ || Liberty* || #14 || Lupton StadiumFort Worth, TX || W9–2 || King(1–1) || Meyer(0–1) || — || 2,101 || 4–2 || — || StatsStory
|- bgcolor="#bbffbb"
| February 27 || 4:00 pm || ESPN+ || Liberty* || #14 || Lupton StadiumFort Worth, TX || W12–2 || Krob(1–0) || Gibson(0–2) || — || 2,101 || 5–2 || — || StatsStory
|-

|- bgcolor="#bbffbb"
| March 2 || 6:30 pm || ESPN+ || Stephen F. Austin* || #13 || Lupton StadiumFort Worth, TX || W9–3 || Meador(1–0) || Sgambelluri(0–1) || — || 2,101 || 6–2 || — || StatsStory
|- bgcolor="#bbffbb"
| March 5 || 3:00 pm || AT&T SW || vs. TAMU–CC* || #13 || Minute Maid ParkHouston, TX || W15–5(7) || Hill(1–0) || Perez(1–1) || — ||  || 7–2 || — || StatsStory
|- bgcolor="#bbffbb"
| March 6 || 7:00 pm || AT&T SW || vs. Texas State* || #13 || Minute Maid ParkHouston, TX || W10–0(8) || Smith2–0 || Sundgren(0–1) || — ||  || 8–2 || — || StatsStory
|- bgcolor="#ffbbbb"
| March 7 || 3:00 pm || AT&T SW || vs. Sam Houston State* || #13 || Minute Maid ParkHouston, TX || L5–6(10) || Havlicek(1–0) || Wright(0–1) || — ||  || 8–3 || — || StatsStory
|- bgcolor="#ffbbbb"
| March 9 || 6:00 pm ||  || at Texas State* || #9 || Bobcat BallparkSan Marcos, TX || L1–11(7) || Herrmann(1–0) || Meador(1–1) || — || 700 || 8–4 || — || StatsStory
|- bgcolor="#bbffbb"
| March 10 || 6:00 pm ||  || at UTSA* || #9 || Roadrunner FieldSan Antonio, TX || W6–3 || Brown(2–0) || Ward(0–1) || Green(1) || 152 || 9–4 || — || StatsStory
|- bgcolor="#ffbbbb"
| March 12 || 6:30 pm || ESPN+ || * || #9 || Lupton StadiumFort Worth, TX || L8–13 || Mullan(1–0) || Cornelio(0–1) || — || 1,975 || 9–5 || — || StatsStory
|- bgcolor="#bbffbb"
| March 13 || 2:00 pm || ESPN+ || Gonzaga* || #9 || Lupton StadiumFort Worth, TX || W7–1 || Smith(3–0) || Kempner(1–1) || Green(2) || 1,943 || 10–5 || — || StatsStory
|- bgcolor="#ffbbbb"
| March 14 || 1:00 pm || ESPN+ || Gonzaga* || #9 || Lupton StadiumFort Worth, TX || L7–10(11) || Naughton(1–0) || Green(1–1) || — || 2,071 || 10–6 || — || StatsStory
|- bgcolor="#bbffbb"
| March 16 || 6:30 pm || ESPN+ || * || #15 || Lupton StadiumFort Worth, TX || W20–2(7) || Cornelio(1–1) || Mapston(0–2) || — || 2,214 || 11–6 || — || StatsStory
|- bgcolor="#ffbbbb"
| March 19 || 6:00 pm || ESPN+ || at Louisiana* || #15 || Moore FieldLafayette, LA || L2–7 || Arrighetti(3–1) || Smith(3–1) || — || 918 || 11–7 || — || StatsStory
|- bgcolor="#bbffbb"
| March 20 || 2:00 pm || ESPN+ || at Louisiana* || #15 || Moore FieldLafayette, LA || W13–4 || Krob(2–0) || Durke(2–2) || — || 902 || 12–7 || — || StatsStory
|- bgcolor="#bbffbb"
| March 21 || 1:00 pm || ESPN+ || at Louisiana* || #15 || Moore FieldLafayette, LA || W5–1 || Ray(1–1) || Robinson(1–1) || Green(3) || 894 || 13–7 || — || StatsStory
|- bgcolor="#bbffbb"
| March 26 || 6:30 pm || ESPN+ || Baylor || #13 || Lupton StadiumFort Worth, TX || W3–1 || Smith(4–1) || Thomas(2–2) || Green(4) || 2,701 || 14–7 || 1–0 || StatsStory
|- bgcolor="#bbffbb"
| March 27 || 2:00 pm || ESPN+ || Baylor || #13 || Lupton StadiumFort Worth, TX || W11–2 || Krob(3–0) || Helton(1–2) || — || 2,579 || 15–7 || 2–0 || StatsStory
|- bgcolor="#bbffbb"
| March 28 || 1:00 pm || ESPN+ || Baylor || #13 || Lupton StadiumFort Worth, TX || W10–1 || Ray(2–1) || Kettler(2–1) || — || 2,279 || 16–7 || 3–0 || StatsStory
|- bgcolor="#bbffbb"
| March 30 || 6:30 pm ||  || at UT Arlington* || #12 || Clay Gould BallparkArlington, TX || W5–3 || King(2–1) || Winquest(0–3) || Green(5) || 314 || 17–7 || — || StatsStory
|-

|- bgcolor="#bbffbb"
| April 2 || 6:30 pm ||  || at  || #12 || Mitchell ParkNorman, OK || W11–7 || Smith(5–1) || Olds(1–3) || Green(6) || 727 || 18–7 || 4–0 || Stats Story
|- bgcolor="#bbffbb"
| April 3 || 4:00 pm ||  || at Oklahoma || #12 || Mitchell ParkNorman, OK || W17–6 || Krob(4–0) || Bennett(3–2) || — || 790 || 19–7 || 5–0 || Stats Story
|- bgcolor="#bbffbb"
| April 4 || 2:00 pm ||  || at Oklahoma || #12 || Mitchell ParkNorman, OK || W7–3 || King(3–1) || Carmichael(4–1) || — || 603 || 20–7 || 6–0 || Stats Story
|- bgcolor="#bbffbb"
| April 6 || 3:00 pm || ESPN+ || at * || #10 || Ballow Baseball ComplexStephenville, TX || W13–9 || Ridings(1–0) || Cody(0–1) || — || 796 || 21-7 || — || Stats Story
|- bgcolor="#bbffbb"
| April 9 || 6:30 pm || ESPN+ || at #8 Texas Tech || #10 || Dan Law FieldLubbock, TX || W7–3 || Smith(6–1) || Dallas(1–2) || — || 4,432 || 22-7 || 7-0 || StatsStory
|- bgcolor="#ffbbbb"
| April 10 || 2:00 pm || ESPN+ || at #8 Texas Tech || #10 || Dan Law FieldLubbock, TX || L5–6(10) || Sublette(4–0) || Ridings(1–1) || — || 4,432 || 22-8 || 7-1 || StatsStory
|- bgcolor="#ffbbbb"
| April 11 || 12:00 pm || ESPN+ || at #8 Texas Tech || #10 || Dan Law FieldLubbock, TX || L7–17|| Key(2–0) || Ray(2–2) || — || 3,896 || 22-8 || 7-2 || StatsStory
|- bgcolor="#bbffbb"
| April 13 || 6:30 pm || ESPN+ || Tarleton State* || #12 || Lupton StadiumFort Worth, TX || W10–2 || Perez(1–0) || Thomas(0–3) || Green(7) || 2,188 || 23-9 || — || StatsStory
|- bgcolor="#bbffbb"
| April 16 || 6:30 pm || ESPN+ || #13 Oklahoma State || #12 || Lupton StadiumFort Worth, TX || W9–8 || King(4–1) || Davis(0–1) || Green(8) || 2,218 || 24-9 || 8-2 || StatsStory
|- bgcolor="#bbffbb"
| April 17 || 2:00 pm || ESPN+ || #13 Oklahoma State || #12 || Lupton StadiumFort Worth, TX || W8–7 || Ridings(2–1) || Standlee(3–1) || — || 2,736 || 25-9 || 9-2 || StatsStory
|- bgcolor="#bbffbb"
| April 18 || 1:00 pm || ESPN+ || #13 Oklahoma State || #12 || Lupton StadiumFort Worth, TX || W12–6 || King(5–1) || McLean(0–1) || — || 2,589 || 26-9 || 10-2 || StatsStory
|- bgcolor="#bbffbb"
| April 20 || 6:30 pm || ESPN+ || UT Arlington* || #8 || Lupton StadiumFort Worth, TX || W9–1 || Savage(1–0) || Bost(0–1) || — || 2,145 || 27-9 || — || StatsStory
|- bgcolor="#bbffbb"
| April 23 || 8:00 pm || ESPN+ ||  || #8 || Lupton StadiumFort Worth, TX || W15–1 || Krob(5–0) || Cyr(3–6) || — || 2,136 || 28-9 || 11-2 || StatsStory
|- bgcolor="#bbffbb"
| April 24 || 4:00 pm || ESPN+ || Kansas || #8 || Lupton StadiumFort Worth, TX || W10–3 || Ray(3–2) || Larsen(4–4) || — || 2,708 || 29-9 || 12-2 || StatsStory
|- bgcolor="#ffbbbb"
| April 25 || 1:00 pm || ESPN+ || Kansas || #8 || Lupton StadiumFort Worth, TX || L1–2 || Davis(4–4) || King(5–2) || Ulane(8) || 2,300 || 29-10 || 12-3 || StatsStory
|- bgcolor="#bbffbb"
| April 27 || 6:30 pm ||  || at UT Arlington* || #5 || Clay Gould BallparkArlington, TX || W8–3 || Savage(2–0) || Winquest(1–5) || — || 314 || 30-10 || — || StatsStory
|- bgcolor="#bbffbb"
| April 30 || 5:30 pm || ESPN+ || at  || #5 || Mon. County BallparkGranville, WV || W8–2 || Hill(2–0) || Wolf(3–5) || — || 600 || 31-10 || 13-3 || StatsStory
|-

|- bgcolor="#bbffbb"
| May 1 || 1:00 pm || ESPNU || at West Virginia || #5 || Mon. County BallparkGranville, WV || W5–3 || Krob(6–0) || Carr(1–4) || Ridings(1) || 600 || 32-10 || 14-3 || StatsStory
|- bgcolor="#bbffbb"
| May 2 || 12:00 pm || ESPN+ || at West Virginia || #5 || Mon. County BallparkGranville, WV || W9–1 || Savage(3–0) || Watters(3–1) || — || 600 || 33-10 || 15-3 || StatsStory
|- align="center" bgcolor="lightgrey"
| May 4 || 6:30 pm || ESPN+ || Incarnate Word* ||  || Lupton StadiumFort Worth, TX ||  ||  ||  ||  ||  ||  || — || 
|- bgcolor="#ffbbbb"
| May 7 || 7:30 pm || ESPNU || #6 Texas || #3 || Lupton StadiumFort Worth, TX || L4–5 || Witt(3–0) || Hill(2–1) || Nixon(7) || 3,485 || 33-11 || 15-4 || StatsStory
|- bgcolor="#bbffbb"
| May 8 || 2:00 pm || ESPNU || #6 Texas || #3 || Lupton StadiumFort Worth, TX || W2–1 || Krob(7–0) || Stevens(7–3) || Green(9) || 2,957 || 34-11 || 16-4 || StatsStory
|- bgcolor="#ffbbbb"
| May 9 || 1:00 pm || ESPN+ || #6 Texas || #3 || Lupton StadiumFort Worth, TX || L3–9 || Hansen(6–1) || Ray(5–2) || — || 2,912 || 34-12 || 16-5 || StatsStory
|- align="center" bgcolor="lightgrey"
| May 11 || 6:30 pm || ESPN+ || * ||  || Lupton StadiumFort Worth, TX ||  ||  ||  ||  ||  ||  || — || 
|- align="center" bgcolor=""
| May 14 || 6:30 pm || ESPN+ || Louisiana–Monroe* || #6 || Lupton StadiumFort Worth, TX ||  ||  ||  ||  ||  ||  || — || 
|- align="center" bgcolor=""
| May 15 || 4:00 pm || ESPN+ || Louisiana–Monroe* || #6 || Lupton StadiumFort Worth, TX ||  ||  ||  ||  ||  ||  || — || 
|- align="center" bgcolor=""
| May 16 || 1:00 pm || ESPN+ || Louisiana–Monroe* || #6 || Lupton StadiumFort Worth, TX ||  ||  ||  ||  ||  ||  || — || 
|- align="center" bgcolor=""
| May 18 || 6:30 pm || ESPN+ || Texas State* ||  || Lupton StadiumFort Worth, TX ||  ||  ||  ||  ||  ||  || — || 
|- align="center" bgcolor=""
| May 20 || 6:00 pm || ESPN+ || at Kansas State ||  || Tointon Family StadiumManhattan, KS ||  ||  ||  ||  ||  ||  ||  || 
|- align="center" bgcolor=""
| May 21 || 6:00 pm || ESPN+ || at Kansas State ||  || Tointon Family StadiumManhattan, KS ||  ||  ||  ||  ||  ||  ||  || 
|- align="center" bgcolor=""
| May 22 || 1:00 pm || ESPN+ || at Kansas State ||  || Tointon Family StadiumManhattan, KS ||  ||  ||  ||  ||  ||  ||  || 
|-

| Legend:       = Win       = Loss       = Canceled      Bold = TCU team member
|-
|"*" indicates a non-conference game."#" represents ranking. All rankings from D1Baseball on the date of the contest."()" represents postseason seeding in the Big 12 Tournament or NCAA Regional, respectively.
|-

Rankings

2021 MLB draft

References

TCU Horned Frogs
TCU Horned Frogs baseball seasons
TCU Horned Frogs baseball
TCU